Mount Abbot is a mountain in California's Sierra Nevada, in the John Muir Wilderness. It is located between Mount Mills and Mount Dade along the Sierra Crest and straddles the border between Fresno and Inyo counties.

The peak was named for Henry Larcom Abbot who, in 1855, was a member of the Williamson party of the Pacific Railroad Surveys in California and Oregon. He retired from the United States Army as a brigadier general in 1904.

See also 
 California 4000 meter peaks
 Thirteener

References 

Mountains of Inyo County, California
Mountains of Fresno County, California
Mountains of the John Muir Wilderness
Mountains of Northern California
North American 4000 m summits